The 1857 Alabama gubernatorial election took place on August 3, 1857, in order to elect the governor of Alabama. Democrat Andrew B. Moore won his first term as governor. John A. Winston did not run because he was term-limited.

Candidates

Democratic Party
 Andrew B. Moore, Alabama House Speaker

Election

References

Alabama gubernatorial elections
1857 Alabama elections
Alabama
August 1857 events